Bedford Township, Ohio may refer to:

Bedford Township, Coshocton County, Ohio
Bedford Township, Meigs County, Ohio
Bedford Township, Cuyahoga County, Ohio now defunct.

Ohio township disambiguation pages